Spyros Tzavidas (Greek: Σπύρος Τζαβίδας; born 21 August 2001) is a Greek former professional footballer who played as a winger.

Career
Tzavidas made four appearances for Panathinaikos. He announced his retirement from playing in January 2022 citing an unspecified "health problem".

Personal life
Tzavidas' brother, Marios, is a professional football player.

References

2001 births
Living people
Greek footballers
Association football wingers
Greece youth international footballers
Super League Greece players
Panathinaikos F.C. players
Footballers from Attica
People from East Attica